Aragats may refer to:
Mount Aragats, in Armenia
Aragats, Aragatsotn, Armenia
Aragats, Armavir, Armenia
Aragatsavan, Armenia
Aragats BT, Armenian basketball team

See also 
 Alagyaz (disambiguation)